The German Identity Card is issued to German citizens by local registration offices in Germany and diplomatic missions abroad, while they are produced at the Bundesdruckerei in Berlin.

Obligation of identification

According to the German law of obligation of identification, it is compulsory for everyone in Germany age 16 or older to possess either an identity card or a passport. While police officers and some other government officials have a right to demand to see one of these documents, the law does not stipulate that one is obliged to submit the document at that very moment.

As everyone in Germany must possess an ID card or a passport, acceptance of other official documents (like driving licences) as proof of identity is not guaranteed, especially for old driving licences with less security. Driving licences issued before 2013 are not replaced in Germany, so the same document is kept.

German citizens travelling inside Europe  (except Belarus, Russia, Ukraine and United Kingdom) or to Egypt, French overseas territories, Georgia, Montserrat (max.14 days), Turkey, and on organized tours to Tunisia can use their ID card, which is a machine-readable travel document, instead of a passport.

Just like German passports, German identity cards are valid for ten years (six years if the holder is under 24 on the date of issue).

The ID card currently costs 37€ (€22.80 if the holder is under 24 on the date of issue).

History
In 1938, the Nazis obliged men of military age and Jews (who had a 'J' marked on their card) to carry identity cards. Shortly after the start of World War II, this was extended to apply to all citizens over the age of 15.

In 1951, both the West German and the East German authorities began issuing booklet identity cards in the ID-2 format.

In West Germany an improved identity card was developed in the 1980s and issued from April 1987 on. The card consisted of a single laminated sheet of paper with a machine-readable zone. To prevent counterfeiting, it contained watermarks, microprinting, fluorescent dyes, and multi-colour fluorescent fibres. In addition, the holder's name was laser engraved into the plastic film and the holder's picture was printed on the document, so it could not be removed and replaced by a different one (unlike the older ID cards, where the picture was just glued to the document).

When East Germany joined West Germany on 3 October 1990, the West German identity card was introduced in the former East German territory; unexpired East German identity cards could still be used until 31 December 1995.

In November 2001, the so-called  feature was added – a number of holographic security elements, including a three-dimensional German Eagle, a holographic copy of the holder's picture (the so-called Holographic Shadow Picture), a holographic copy of the machine-readable zone, holographic microprinting, and kinematic elements.

The current ID-1 type has been issued since November 2010. It contains an RFID chip similar to that in biometric passports. The chip stores the information given on the ID card (like name or date of birth), the holder's picture (which, unlike the picture on older ID cards, has to be a biometric one), and, if the holder wishes so, also his/her fingerprints. In addition, the new ID card can be used for online authentication (such as for age verification or for e-government applications). An electronic signature, provided by a private company, can also be stored on the chip.

Physical appearance

The current ID card is an ID-1 (credit card size) plastic card with an embedded RFID chip. It is covered with multi-colour guillochés and appears green-brown from a distance. All the information on it (except for nationality and colour of eyes) is given in German, English, and French.

Front side

The front side shows the German Eagle and the words " / FEDERAL REPUBLIC OF GERMANY / " and " / IDENTITY CARD / ". It contains the following information:

Photo of ID card holder (biometric photo)
Document number (9 alphanumeric digits)
Access number for RFID chip (6 decimal digits)
Surname
Doctorate (only if holder holds this degree)
Birthname (only if differing from current surname)
Given name(s)
Date of birth (dd.mm.yyyy)
Nationality
Place of birth (Only the city/town of birth, no country)
Date of expiry (dd.mm.yyyy)
Signature of holder

Rear side

The rear side shows the Brandenburg Gate. It contains the following information:

Colour of eyes
Height in cm
Date of issue (dd.mm.yy)
Issuing authority
Residence (postal code, town, street, house number)
Religious name or Pseudonym (only if holder has one)
Machine-readable zone

Machine-readable zone

The MRZ is structured according to the ICAO standard for machine-readable ID cards:

First line

Second line

Third line

Empty spaces are represented by "<".

Different spellings of the same name within the same document
 The transcription mentioned above is generally used for aircraft tickets etc., but sometimes (like in US visas) also simple vowels are used, so passport, visa, and aircraft ticket may display different spellings of the same name.
The three possible spelling variants of the same name (e.g. ) in different documents sometimes lead to confusion, and the use of two different spellings within the same document may give persons unfamiliar with German orthography the impression that the document is a forgery.
 Non-German names: In some names of naturalised citizens, some special letters that are not available may always be replaced by simple letters, also in the non-machine-readable zone. In the machine-readable zone, special characters are either replaced by simple characters (e.g.,  becomes ) or transcribed according to the ICAO rules (e.g.,  becomes ,  becomes , etc.).

Names originally written in a non-Latin writing system may pose another problem if there are various internationally recognised transcription standards.

For example, the Russian surname  is transcribed 
"" in German, 
"Gorbachev" in English (also ICAO standard), 
"" in French, 
"" in Spanish, 
"" in Polish, and so on.
German identity documents use the in Germany officially registered name in Latin letters, normally based on transcription into German.

Chip

Newer ID cards contain an ISO 18000-3 and ISO 14443 compatible 13.56 MHz RFID chip that uses the ISO 7816 protocols. The chip stores the information given on the ID card (like name or date of birth), the holder's picture and, if the holder wishes so, also his/her fingerprints. In addition, the new ID card can be used for online authentication (e.g. for age verification or for e-government applications). An electronic signature, provided by a private company, can also be stored on the chip. According to EU rules cards issued after 2021 need to have fingerprints stored in the chip.

The document number, the photo, and the fingerprints can be read only by law enforcement agencies and some other authorities. All ID card
agencies have been supplied with reading devices that have been certified by the German
Federal Office for Information Security (BSI). Agency staff can use these modules to display 
all of the personal data stored on the chip, including the digital passport photo and, where
applicable, the stored fingerprints.

To use the online authentication function, the holder needs a six-digit decimal PIN. If the holder types in the wrong PIN, he has to type in the six-digit decimal access code given on the ID card to prove he/she really possesses the ID card. If the wrong PIN is used three times, a PUK must be used to unlock the chip.
The data on the chip are protected by Basic Access Control and Extended Access Control.

Security features

The identity card contains the following security features:
multicoloured 
microprinting: 
fluorescent elements which luminesce in various colors under UV light:
UV overprint:
 (in microprinting): yellow
: turquoise
randomly distributed fluorescent fibres: red, yellow, turquoise
tactile features:
access number for RFID chip and date of expire are tactile
surface embossing: map of Germany and microlettering 
security thread: colour changes when viewed under different angles; is personalized: NNNNNNNNNN<<SURNAME<<GIVEN<NAMES<<<<<<<<<< (NNNNNNNNNN is the document number including a check digit; a total of 42 digits can be found on the thread))
changeable laser image: shows either the date of expire or the holder's portrait depending on angle
color-changing ink: the colour of the text  changes from black to green to blue 
2D and 3D holographic security elements:
colour-changing holograms: colour changes depending on angle (violet-blue-turquoise-green-yellow-orange-red)
holographic portrait: holographic reproduction of the holder's picture
four eagles at the left side of the holographic portrait: change their colour under a different angle than the portrait itself
document number: NNNNNNNNN, 9 digits
holder's name: SURNAME<<GIVEN<NAMES<<<<<<<<<<, 30 digits
green kinematic structures above the conventional picture:
eagle: bright eagle on dark hexagon changes to dark eagle on bright hexagon to letter  in hexagon when document is tilted
hexagon: moves across the picture when document is tilted
stars: change their size when document is tilted
letter : moves across the picture and turns into a star
text on the left side of the picture; visible only under a certain angle
macrolettering: 
microlettering: 
machine-verifiable structure: a red spot which can be checked by machines
3D eagle: a red-gold eagle visible only under a certain angle

Problems and challenges 
The benefits and even the existence of the electronic ID cards are largely unknown to German citizens which is why the vast majority does not use it. In 2019, only 6 percent of all German citizens made use of their electronic ID. 32% have not even activated the service, mostly because they do not know what to do with it or what it is or they do not see additional value in it. The German government, therefore, has failed to communicate the potential value that it adds to the lives of the citizens and to build trust in it. The government's attempt to boost the usage by automatically enabling the service on newly issued ID cards does not address the issue of trust and value proposition.

Additionally, the eID is not applicable for many transactions compared to other countries. Only 45 services are available which can be used by all German citizens, the remaining 86 are only usable in specific municipalities and federal states (BCG, 2020). Introducing the electronic services is costly, which means that there also exist adaptation barriers from the site of the provider, especially for small administrative offices.
The slow development is also problematic for the introduction of future electronic services in other areas. For example, the eID is a requirement for digital medical records offered by health insurances (BCG, 2020). This implies that the slow adaptation of the eID also slows down digitalisation in other areas.

Learnings
In developed countries such as Germany, electronic ID cards were the inevitable option, given their feasibility and widespread availability. Placing a microchip in the ID card and storing the required data provides electronic identification and signature for every person who possesses it.  To get an ID card, a person must undergo identification verification at the Ministry of the Interior (MUP). An eID enables the conduct of various online administrative processes but the carriers of financial services are considered to benefit from this innovation and support it the most. All of that is being a part of the digitization policy.

East German Identity Card
Identity cards in East Germany came in the form of paper booklets in a blue plastic cover, much like modern day passports. On the outside, the Emblem of the German Democratic Republic as well as the words "" ("German Democratic Republic") are embossed. Inside the cover page there is a notice to the bearer: 
Bürger der Deutschen Demokratischen Republik
Dieser Ausweis ist Ihr wichtigstes Dokument

Sie haben deshalb:

1. diesen Personalausweis stets bei sich zu tragen, sorgfältig zu behandeln, vor Verlust zu schützen und auf Verlangen der Volkspolizei vorzuzeigen bzw. auszuhändigen;

2. keine eigenmächtigen Eintragungen im Ausweis vorzunehmen, diesen nicht als Pfand oder zur Benutzung anderen Personen zu überlassen bzw. von anderen Personen entgegenzunehmen;

3. jeden Wohnungswechsel innerhalb von drei Tagen bei der zuständigen VP-Dienststelle zu melden;

4. jeden Verlust dieses Ausweises unverzüglich bei der nächsten VP-Dienststelle anzuzeigen.
Which translates to:
Citizen of the German Democratic Republic

This identity card is your most important document

Therefore you must:

2. not make any entries into this identity card, give it to another person as a pawn or to be used, or accept it as such;

3. notify the responsible  office of any change of residence within three days;

4. immediately report any loss of this identity card to the nearest VP office.

See also
German passport
German residence permit (identity document for non-EU citizens living in Germany) 
 (identity document used in Nazi Germany)
National identity cards in the European Union

References

External links

 General information about the new German ID card on personalausweisportal.de (German)
 General information about the new German ID card on bundesdruckerei.de (English)
 Security features of the new German ID card on bundesdruckerei.de (English)
 Security features of the 1987–2001 ID card on PRADO (English)
 Security features of the 2001–2010 ID card on PRADO (English)
 Security features of the current ID card on PRADO (English)

Germany
Identity documents of Germany
Privacy in Germany